Since the administrative reform in 1992, Munich is divided into 25 boroughs or Stadtbezirke:

References
Source: muenchen.de